In mathematics, and more precisely in  analysis, the Wallis integrals constitute a family of integrals introduced by John Wallis.

Definition, basic properties 
The Wallis integrals are the terms of the sequence  defined by

or equivalently,

The first few terms of this sequence are:

The sequence  is decreasing and has positive terms.  In fact, for all 
 because it is an integral of a non-negative continuous function which is not identically zero;
 again because the last integral is of a non-negative continuous function.
Since the sequence  is decreasing and bounded below by 0, it converges to a non-negative limit. Indeed, the limit is zero (see below).

Recurrence relation
By means of integration by parts, a  reduction formula can be obtained.  Using the identity , we have for all ,

Integrating the second integral by parts, with:
 , whose anti-derivative is 
 , whose derivative is 
we have:

Substituting this result into equation (1) gives

and thus

for all 

Another relation to evaluate the Wallis' integrals 
Wallis's integrals can be evaluated by using Euler integrals:
Euler integral of the first kind: the Beta function: 
 for 
Euler integral of the second kind: the Gamma function: 
If we make the following substitution inside the Beta function:

we obtain:

so this gives us the following relation to evaluate the Wallis integrals:

So, for odd , writing , we have:

whereas for even , writing  and knowing that , we get :

Equivalence 

 From the recurrence formula above , we can deduce that
 (equivalence of two sequences).

Indeed, for all  :
 (since the sequence is decreasing)
 (since )
 (by equation ).
By the sandwich theorem, we conclude that , and hence .

By examining , one obtains the following equivalence:

 (and consequently   ).

Deducing Stirling's formula 
Suppose that we have the following equivalence (known as Stirling's formula):

for some constant  that we wish to determine.  From above, we have
 (equation (3))

Expanding  and using the formula above for the factorials, we get

From  (3) and (4), we obtain by transitivity:

Solving for  gives   In other words,

Deducing the Double Factorial Ratio 
Similarly, from above, we have:

Expanding  and using the formula above for double factorials, we get:

Simplifying, we obtain:

or

Evaluating the Gaussian Integral 

The Gaussian integral can be evaluated through the use of Wallis' integrals.

We first prove the following inequalities:

In fact, letting ,
the first inequality (in which ) is
whereas the second inequality reduces to
,
which becomes .
These 2 latter inequalities follow from the convexity of the
exponential function
(or from an analysis of the function ).

Letting  and
making use of the basic properties of improper integrals
(the convergence of the integrals is obvious),
we obtain the inequalities:

for use with the sandwich theorem (as ).

The first and last integrals can be evaluated easily using
Wallis' integrals.
For the first one, let 
(t varying from 0 to ).
Then, the integral becomes .
For the last integral, let 
Then, it becomes .

As we have shown before,
. So, it follows that
.

Remark: There are other methods of evaluating the Gaussian integral.
Some of them are more direct.

Note 

The same properties lead to Wallis product,
which expresses 
(see )
in the form of an infinite product.

External links 
 Pascal Sebah and Xavier Gourdon.  Introduction to the Gamma Function.  In PostScript and HTML formats.

Integrals